Mesøya or Mesøy is an island in the municipality of Meløy in Nordland county, Norway. The island is located just southwest of the village of Ørnes on the mainland and east of the island of Meløya. The island sits at the mouth of the Glomfjorden. Mesøya is only accessible by boat, and it has no regular ferry service.

See also
List of islands of Norway

References

Islands of Nordland
Meløy